Pachylia syces is a moth of the  family Sphingidae.

Distribution 
It is found from Mexico through Belize and Honduras to Brazil, Bolivia and Argentina. It is also found on Jamaica.

Description 
There is a pale median band on the forewing upperside which is separated into two patches. Occasionally the patches are connected into a continuous transverse band, but if so, the band so formed is strongly constricted. The hindwing upperside is almost unicolorous, darkened distally, without distinct bands and with a conspicuous white tip.

Biology 
There are probably multiple generations per year.

The larvae have been recorded feeding on Ficus microcarpa, Ficus prinoides, Ficus ovalis and Artocarpus integrifolia.

Subspecies 
Pachylia syces syces (Mexico through Belize and Honduras to Brazil, Bolivia, Paraguay and Argentina)
Pachylia syces insularis Rothschild & Jordan, 1903 (Jamaica)

References

Dilophonotini
Moths described in 1819